Roald Max Antoine van Noort (born March 2, 1960 in Elst) is a former water polo player from the Netherlands, who finished in sixth position with the Dutch National Men's Team at the 1984 Summer Olympics in Los Angeles.

References
 Dutch Olympic Committee

1960 births
Living people
Dutch male water polo players
Olympic water polo players of the Netherlands
People from Rhenen
Water polo players at the 1984 Summer Olympics
Sportspeople from Utrecht (province)
20th-century Dutch people